Norfolcioconcha norfolkensis is a species of small air-breathing land snail, a terrestrial pulmonate gastropod mollusc, in the family Charopidae. This species is endemic to Norfolk Island.

References

Gastropods of Norfolk Island
Charopidae
Vulnerable fauna of Australia
Gastropods described in 1899
Taxonomy articles created by Polbot
Taxobox binomials not recognized by IUCN